Ahorn is a municipality in the district of Main-Tauber in Baden-Württemberg in Germany. It consists of the villages Berolzheim, Buch, Eubigheim, Hohenstadt, and Schillingstadt.

References

Main-Tauber-Kreis